Domeček (or Hradčanský domeček) is an informal name for a former small prison in Hradčany, district of Prague. The name in Czech means 'small house' and refers to the size of the building.

Domeček, placed next to the building of a military court, had served as a military prison during the Austro-Hungarian period. It was used by the Gestapo during World War II and since 1948 the Czechoslovakian security service (StB) employed it as a secret prison. It hosted 30 solitary cells.

StB used the place for torture of political opponents, among them the officers of the pre-war army or members of the anti-nazi resistance.

References
 Zdeněk F. Šedivý: Domeček - Mučírna na Hradčanech, Moba, 2004,

External links

Defunct prisons in the Czech Republic
Buildings and structures in Prague
StB